Harry Bayless Stockwell (April 27, 1902 – July 19, 1984) was an American actor and singer.

Stockwell made his film debut in the 1935 film Here Comes the Band. However, his claim to fame came in 1937, when he provided the voice of The Prince (seen at the beginning and again in the finale) in Walt Disney's animated classic Snow White and the Seven Dwarfs. Stockwell was also a noted Broadway performer. In 1943, he succeeded Alfred Drake as Curly, the lead role in Broadway's Oklahoma! He remained in the role until 1948.  His final role was in The Werewolf of Washington in 1973. He was the father of actors Dean Stockwell and Guy Stockwell with first wife Elizabeth Veronica. In 1950, he married actress and performer Nina Olivette.

Early life
Stockwell was born on April 27, 1902,  in Kansas City, Missouri, to Cora Ellen Teter and her husband William Henry Stockwell.  He made his Broadway debut in 1929 in Broadway Nights. The following year he appeared in the 1930 edition of Earl Carroll's Vanities Stockwell started a yearlong run in another musical revue on the Great White Way, As Thousands Cheer.

Career
Harry made his first film Broadway Melody of 1936 and Here Comes the Band. He later lent his voice to the unnamed prince in Snow White and the Seven Dwarfs.

Death
Stockwell died in New York City on July 19, 1984, aged 82.

Filmography

References

External links

 Harry Stockwell performs in audio recordings on Archive.org

1902 births
1984 deaths
American male film actors
American male musical theatre actors
American male stage actors
American male voice actors
Male actors from Kansas City, Missouri
20th-century American male actors
20th-century American male singers
20th-century American singers
Deaths from diabetes